Hamza Bešić (born 27 September 2000) is a Bosnian professional footballer who plays as a centre-back for First League of FBiH club Vis Simm-Bau, on loan from Sarajevo.

Honours
Sarajevo
Bosnian Cup: 2020–21

References

External links

2000 births
Living people
Footballers from Sarajevo
Association football central defenders
Bosnia and Herzegovina footballers
FK Sarajevo players
FK Olimpik players
NK Vis Simm-Bau players
Premier League of Bosnia and Herzegovina players
First League of the Federation of Bosnia and Herzegovina players